The 2020 Delaware Fightin' Blue Hens football team represented the University of Delaware as a member of the North Division of the Colonial Athletic Association (CAA) during the 2020–21 NCAA Division I FCS football season. Led by fourth-year head coach Danny Rocco, the Fightin' Blue Hens compiled an overall record of 7–1 with a mark of 4–0 in conference play, winning the CAA and CAA North Division titles. Delaware advanced to the NCAA Division I Football Championship playoffs, the Fightin' Blue Hens beat Sacred Heart in the first round and Jacksonville State in the quarterfinals before losing to eventual national runner-up, South Dakota State, in the semifinals. The team played home games at Delaware Stadium in Newark, Delaware. 

On July 17, 2020, the CAA announced that it would not play fall sports due to the COVID-19 pandemic. Although the conference allowed the option for teams to play as independents for the 2020 season if they still wish to play in the fall, the Blue Hens postponed their season until spring 2021.

Previous season

The Fightin' Blue Hens finished the 2019 season 5–7, 3–5 in CAA play to finish tied for ninth in the conference.

Schedule
Delaware originally had a game scheduled against Delaware State (November 21), but it was canceled on July 16 due to the Mid-Eastern Athletic Conference (MEAC)'s decision to cancel fall sports due to the COVID-19 pandemic. The CAA released its spring conference schedule on October 27, 2020.

Coaching staff

References

Delaware
Delaware Fightin' Blue Hens football seasons
Colonial Athletic Association football champion seasons
Delaware
Delaware Fightin' Blue Hens football